Mount Le Conte (or Mount LeConte) can refer to:
 Mount Le Conte (California)
 Mount Le Conte (Tennessee)
 Le Conte Mountain (Washington)